Kordelio–Evosmos (Kordelió-Évosmos) is a municipality of the Thessaloniki Urban Area in the regional unit of Thessaloniki, Central Macedonia, Greece. The seat of the municipality is in Evosmos. The municipality has an area of 13.358 km2 and a population of 105,426 people (2021 census).

Municipality
The municipality Kordelio–Evosmos was formed at the 2011 local government reform by the merger of the following 2 former municipalities, that became municipal units:
Eleftherio-Kordelio
Evosmos

References

Municipalities of Central Macedonia
Populated places in Thessaloniki (regional unit)